The Hospital Universitario Ramón y Cajal is a public general hospital located in the Valverde neighborhood, in Madrid, Spain, part of the hospital network of the Servicio Madrileño de Salud.

It is one of the healthcare institutions associated to the University of Alcalá for the purpose of clinical internship.

History 
Named after Santiago Ramón y Cajal, it was opened on 18 October 1977, receiving the nickname of (el) piramidón. It was criticised back then because of its location, cost and size.

It developed the first service in Spain for pediatric cardiology (1977) and the first unit of cardiac rehabilitation (1979). Aside from the teaching and medical attention features, it is noted by its research prowess (the first in the region in scientific research production), particularly in the scope of clinical microbiology and infectious diseases. As of 2017 it has 901 beds. At the peak of the COVID-19 pandemia in Madrid, in March and April 2020, the hospital had 994 beds occupied by patients of COVID-19.

References 

Buildings and structures in Fuencarral-El Pardo District, Madrid
Ramon y Cajal